Wang Yang (born February 1957) is a former Chinese politician. He held a series of positions in governments at the municipal and provincial level in northeast China's Liaoning province for more than 30 years. He was investigated by the Communist Party of China's anti-graft agency in March 2016. At the time of his downfall, he was serving as vice-chairman of the Liaoning People's Congress.

Biography

Early life and education
Wang was born in Heyang County, Shaanxi in February 1957. He was a sent-down youth during the Down to the Countryside Movement in Dawa County, Liaoning province. After the Cultural Revolution, he became a worker at Anshan Glass Factory. He entered Liaoning University in September 1979, majoring in philosophy, where he graduated in August 1983. After graduation, he taught at Anshan Training School for Cadres.

Career
He began his political career in January 1984, as an officer in the General Office of the Anshan municipal party committee, rising to deputy director of the office nine years later. Then he successively served as party boss of Jiubao District in May 1994 and Qianshan District in June 1996. During his term in office, he studied as a graduate student at Northeastern University, majoring in management engineering. In March 1999 he became secretary-general Anshan party committee, and four years later promoted to deputy party chief. In August 2004, he was elevated to secretary general of CPC Liaoning Provincial Committee, a position he held until February 2008, when he was appointed deputy party boss and acting mayor of Fushun. In August 2010, he was named deputy party boss and acting mayor of Anshan, and held that offices until January 2012, when he was promoted again to become party boss of Fuxin. In January 2013, Wang Yang rose to become vice-chairman of the Liaoning People's Congress.

Downfall
On March 16, 2016, Wang Yang was suspected of "serious violations of Party discipline", and placed under investigation by the Central Commission for Discipline Inspection (CCDI). Wang was expelled from the Communist Party on June 2, 2016, for violated Eight-point Regulation and bribery.

On May 31, 2017, Wang was sentenced on 16 years and 6 months in prison for taking bribes worth 62.91 million yuan (~$9.26 million) and vote-buying by the Intermediate People's Court in Daqing.

Personal life
Wang Yang has a daughter, Wang Shengqi (born 1987), a graduate of the University of Manchester and Oxford University. In 2011, at the age of 24, she was appointed deputy dean of the International Education College of Liaoning University of Petroleum and Chemical Technology, a position at deputy-division level on China's government administrative hierarchy.

References

External links

1957 births
Northeastern University (China) alumni
Liaoning University alumni
Living people
People's Republic of China politicians from Shaanxi
Chinese Communist Party politicians from Shaanxi
Expelled members of the Chinese Communist Party
Chinese politicians convicted of corruption